

Dinosaurs

References